Alireza Rahimi is an Iranian reformist politician who is currently a member of the Parliament of Iran representing Tehran, Rey, Shemiranat and Eslamshahr electoral district.

Career 
Rahimi fought in the Iran–Iraq War and was wounded in Operation Dawn when he was only 14. Then he was held prisoner by Iraqi Army for more than a year. He is a member of the BARAN Foundation. In the 2008 Iranian legislative election, he was included in both reformist lists, Popular Coalition of Reforms and Reformists Coalition: Friends of Khatami, but lost the election.

Electoral history

References

1968 births
Living people
People from Shushtar
Iranian prisoners of war
Shahid Beheshti University alumni
Alumni of Robert Gordon University
Iranian jurists
Members of the 10th Islamic Consultative Assembly
Iran–Iraq War prisoners of war
Volunteer Basij personnel of the Iran–Iraq War
Prisoners of war held by Iraq